Medical Imaging & Technology Alliance (MITA) is a lobby for equipment manufacturers of medical imaging machinery.

Standards
MITA is also the source of the DICOM standard and the XR series of medical imaging and radiation dose standards:

XR 26-2012 Access Controls for Computer Tomography: Identification, Interlocks, and Logs

XR 27-2012 User QC Standard

XR 24-2008 Primary User Controls for Interventional Angiography X-ray Equipment

XR 23-2006 Quality Control Manual Template for Manufacturers of Hardcopy Output Devices Labeled for Final Interpretation in Full-Field Digital mammography (FFDM)

XR 22-2006 Quality Control Manual Template for Manufacturers of Displays and Workstations Labeled for Final Interpretation in Full-Field Digital Mammography (FFDM)

XR 21-2000 Characteristics of and Test Procedures for a Phantom to Benchmark Cardiac Fluoroscopic and Photographic Performance

XR 19-1993 (R1999) Electrical, Thermal and Loading Characteristics of X-ray Tubes Used for Medical Diagnosis

XR 18-1993 (R1999) Test Standard for the Determination of the Radial Image Distortion of an X-ray image intensifier (XRII) System

XR 17-1993 (R1999) Test Standard for the Measurement of the Image Signal Uniformity of an X-ray Image Intensifier (XRII) System

XR 16-1991 (R1996, R2001) Test Standard for the Determination of the System Contrast Ratio (SCR) and the System Veiling Glare Index (SVGI) of an X-ray Image Intensifier (XRII) System

XR 15-1991 (R1996, R2001) Test Standard for the Determination of the Visible Entrance Field Size of an X-R=ray Image Intensifier (XRII) System

XR 14-1990 (R1995, R2000) Recommended Practices for Load-Bearing Mechanical Assemblies Used in Diagnostic Imaging

NEMA XR 13-1990 (R1995, R2000) Mechanical Safety Standard for Power Driven Motions of Electromedical Equipment

XR 11-1993 (R1999) Test Standard for the Determination of the Limiting Spatial Resolution of X-ray Image Intensifier Systems

XR 10-1986 (R1992, R1998, R2003) Measurement of the Maximum Symmetrical Radiation Field from a Rotating Anode X-ray Tube Used for Medical Diagnosis

XR 9-1984 (R1994, R2000) Power Supply Guidelines for X-ray Machines

XR 7-1995 (R2000) Electrical, Thermal and Loading Characteristics of X-ray Tubes Used for Medical Diagnosis

XR 5-1992 (R1999) Measurement of Dimensions and Properties of Focal Spots of Diagnostic X-ray Tubes

References

External links
 Imaging groups not onboard with BCBS prior authorization proposal from Healthcare IT News

Information technology lobbying organizations
Medical imaging organizations